Lukoschus is a genus of mites in the family Laelapidae that was named after the German acarologist Fritz Lukoschus.

Species
 Lukoschus maresi Radovsky & Gettinger, 1999

References

Laelapidae